Luke Pither (born April 26, 1989) is a Canadian professional ice hockey centre. He is currently signed with Saugeen Shores Winterhawks of the WOAA Senior AA Hockey League.

Playing career
After five seasons of playing junior hockey in the Ontario Hockey League, Pither signed a three-year entry level contract with the Philadelphia Flyers on March 4, 2010.

On January 13, 2013, it was announced Pither was traded by the Flyers to the Carolina Hurricanes in exchange for goalie Brian Boucher and Mark Alt.

On July 29, 2013, Pither moved abroad and signed a one-year contract as a free agent in Finland with KalPa who competed in the Liiga. In the 2013–14 season, Pither was hampered by injury and played in just 20 games, contributing with 5 goals.

Pither opted to change European leagues, in agreeing to a one-year contract with Austrian club EC KAC of the EBEL on May 22, 2014.

After two seasons in Europe, Pither returned to North America and with the 2015–16 season underway, signed a contract with the Brampton Beast of the ECHL on October 28, 2015. He played two seasons with the Beast, with short stints spread throughout the AHL, before agreeing to return abroad in signing a one-year deal with Swedish outfit, Almtuna IS, of the HockeyAllsvenskan on June 7, 2017.

In January 2018, Pither moved to the UK's EIHL to sign for the Nottingham Panthers, remaining with the team until 2019.

After a season in Germany's DEL2 with EHC Freiburg, Pither returned to Canada to sign with former club, the Brampton Beast of the ECHL on October 16, 2020. With the Beast later suspending operations for the season due to the ongoing COVID-19 pandemic, Pither was subsequently released as a free agent.

Pither later had a short spell in the Alps Hockey League (AlpsHL) with HC Pustertal Wölfe before returning to the DEL2 for the 2021-22 season with Bayreuth Tigers.

Career statistics

References

External links
 

Living people
1989 births
Adirondack Phantoms players
Barrie Colts players
Belleville Bulls players
Brampton Beast players
Canadian ice hockey centres
Charlotte Checkers (2010–) players
Guelph Storm players
KalPa players
Kingston Frontenacs players
EC KAC players
EHC Freiburg players
Nottingham Panthers players
HC Pustertal Wölfe players
St. John's IceCaps players
Sportspeople from Oshawa
Syracuse Crunch players
Trenton Titans players
Utica Comets players
Wheeling Nailers players
Canadian expatriate ice hockey players in England
Canadian expatriate ice hockey players in Austria
Canadian expatriate ice hockey players in Finland
Ice hockey people from Ontario
Canadian expatriate ice hockey players in the United States
Canadian expatriate ice hockey players in Germany
Canadian expatriate ice hockey players in Sweden
Canadian expatriate ice hockey players in Italy
EHC Bayreuth players